The Estadio José Jorge Contte is an indoor arena in Corrientes, Argentina. It is primarily used for basketball and is the home arena of Regatas Corrientes. It's one of the biggest in the north region of Argentina, holding 2,600 people.

It hosted the 2015 FIVB Volleyball Boys' U19 World Championship.

References  

Jose Jorge Conte
Basketball venues in Argentina